Rob Flick (born March 28, 1991) is a Canadian professional ice hockey centre. He is currently playing for HK Dukla Trenčín in the Slovak Extraliga. 

Flick was selected by the Chicago Blackhawks in the 4th round (120th overall) of the 2010 NHL Entry Draft.

Playing career
Flick played three seasons (2008–2011) of major junior hockey in the Ontario Hockey League (OHL) with the Mississauga St. Michael's Majors where he scored 46 goals and 53 assists in 181 games played. In 2010 and 2011 Flick led the Mississauga team with 157 and 167 penalty minutes, respectively.

Flick made his professional debut in the American Hockey League with the Rockford Ice Hogs on October 8, 2011.

On April 3, 2013, the Chicago Blackhawks traded Flick to the Boston Bruins in exchange for Maxime Sauvé. He was immediately assigned to the Bruins namesake AHL affiliate in Providence.

On July 2, 2015, after three seasons within the Bruins organization, Flick left as a free agent to sign a one-year, two-way contract with the Florida Panthers. He spent the duration of the 2015–16 season, with the Panthers AHL affiliate, the Portland Pirates, recording 21 points in 60 games.

As a free agent for a second consecutive season, Flick was unable to obtain an NHL offer, opting to continue his professional career in the ECHL with the South Carolina Stingrays on a one-year deal on August 31, 2016.

In the 2018-19 season he signed a contract with the German second league team Eispiraten Crimmitschau. He led his team in scoring and was a top 3 goal-scorer (34 goals) from the DEL2.

For the 2019-20 season he started with a PTO with the DEL2-Champion Ravensburg Towerstars and changed in November 2019 in the Austrian Hockey League to the Czechs team Orli Znojmo.

Career statistics

References

External links

1991 births
Living people
Canadian ice hockey centres
Chicago Blackhawks draft picks
ETC Crimmitschau players
HKM Zvolen players
HK Dukla Trenčín players
Ice hockey people from Ontario
Manitoba Moose players
Mississauga St. Michael's Majors players
Portland Pirates players
Providence Bruins players
Rockford IceHogs (AHL) players
South Carolina Stingrays players
Sportspeople from London, Ontario
Toledo Walleye players
EC VSV players
Canadian expatriate ice hockey players in Austria
Canadian expatriate ice hockey players in Germany
Canadian expatriate ice hockey players in the United States
Canadian expatriate ice hockey players in the Czech Republic
Canadian expatriate ice hockey players in Hungary
Canadian expatriate ice hockey players in Slovakia